Browning's Beach Historic District is a historic district west of the junction between Card Pond and Matunuck Beach Roads in South Kingstown, Rhode Island.  It encompasses a cluster of four beach houses located on a barrier beach facing Long Island Sound south of Cards Pond, and accessed via a private gravel drive extending from Cards Pond Road.  The four houses, along with several outbuildings, were built in the early years of the 20th century, and are architecturally diverse expressions of Queen Anne, Shingle, and Colonial Revival elements.  Typical architectural elements include shingle siding, recessed porches, and chalet-style roofs.

Unfortunately, erosion and storms like Hurricane Sandy in 2012 caused damage to the beaches and houses. The four houses are know all on pegs and have been moved back from their original locations.

The district was listed on the National Register of Historic Places in 1997.

See also
National Register of Historic Places listings in Washington County, Rhode Island

References

Historic districts in Washington County, Rhode Island
Historic districts on the National Register of Historic Places in Rhode Island